Kim Jeong-hyun (김정현; born May 16, 1988) is a South Korean football player who since 2007 has played for Incheon United.

Club career statistics

External links
 

1988 births
Living people
Association football forwards
South Korean footballers
Incheon United FC players
K League 1 players